Balgarchevo is a village in Blagoevgrad Municipality, in Blagoevgrad Province, Bulgaria on the right bank of the Struma river 5 kilometers northwest of Blagoevgrad.

References

Villages in Blagoevgrad Province